The European Business Law Review is a law journal covering business law, broadly defined and including both European Union law and the laws of the Member States and other European countries. It is published by Kluwer Law International.

External links
 

Business law journals
European law journals
Bimonthly journals
English-language journals
Publications established in 1990